Susanna Marchesi (born 13 March 1980) is a former Italian individual rhythmic gymnast. She represents her nation at international competitions. 

She participated at the 2000 Summer Olympics in Sydney. She also competed at world championships, including at the 1999 and 2003 World Rhythmic Gymnastics Championships. She ranked 6th in All-around finals at the 1999 World Rhythmic Gymnastics Championships.

References

External links

1980 births
Living people
Italian rhythmic gymnasts
Place of birth missing (living people)
Gymnasts at the 2000 Summer Olympics
Olympic gymnasts of Italy
Sportspeople from Arezzo
21st-century Italian women